Pilavullakandi Thekkeraparambil Usha  (born 27 June 1964) is a retired Indian track and field athlete. She was born in Kuthali, Kozhikode, Kerala. She has been associated with Indian athletics since 1979. She has won 4 Asian gold medals and 7 Silver medals. She is often associated as the "Queen of Indian track and field". On 6 July 2022, she was nominated to the Rajya Sabha by former President Ram Nath Kovind. In December 2022, Usha has been elected president of the Indian Olympic Association unopposed. In Dec 2022, PT Usha has been appointed to the panel of Rajyasabha vice chairman to control the proceedings of the upper house during the absence of both Chairman & Deputy Chairman.She is the first nominated MP in history to become the Vice Chairperson of Rajyasabha

Career 
Usha was first noticed in 1977 by O. M. Nambiar, an athletics coach, at a sports prize-distribution ceremony. In an interview with Rediff.com in 2000, he recalled: "What impressed me at first sight about Usha was her lean shape and fast walking style. I knew she could become a very good sprinter." The same year, he began coaching her. Quick results followed when she won six medals at the inter-state meet for juniors, in Kollam in 1978, with four gold medals in 100 m, 200 m, 60 m hurdles and high jump, silver in long jump and bronze in 4 x 100 m relay. In the year's Kerala State college meet, she won 14 medals. She went on to win multiple medals at the 1979 National Games and 1980 National inter-state meet setting many meet records.

At the senior inter-state meet in Bangalore in 1981, Usha clocked 11.8 seconds in the 100 m and 24.6 seconds in the 200 m setting national records in both. At the 1982 New Delhi Asian Games, she won silver medals in 100 m and 200 m, clocking 11.95 s and 25.32 s. At the 1983 Open National Championships in Jamshedpur, she broke the 200 m national record again clocking 23.9 s, and with 53.6 s, set a new national record in 400 m. At the Asian Championships in Kuwait City the same year, she won gold in 400 m.

1984 Los Angeles Olympics

Usha's best moment came at the 1984 Los Angeles Olympics. She entered on the back of a string of good performances at the year's New Delhi inter-state meet and Mumbai Open National Championships. However, poor performances in 100m and 200m at the Moscow World Championships prompted her to concentrate on the 400 m hurdles. At the Olympics trials in Delhi, she beat Asian Champion M. D. Valsamma to qualify for the Games. At another pre-Olympics trials, she clocked 55.7 seconds beating American top sprinter Judi Brown. At the Games, she clocked 56.81 s in the heats and 55.54 s in the semi-final, setting a new Commonwealth record as she entered the final. At the final, she came fourth, at 55.42 seconds, falling behind the eventual bronze medalist by 1/100th of a second. This followed after one of her competitors had a false start, which was said to have "broken her rhythm" as "she got off the blocks a bit slower at the restart."

In the 1985 Jakarta Asian Championships, Usha won six medals — five gold and one bronze. She won the 100 m in 11.64, 200 m in 23.05, 400 m in 52.62, an Asian record, and 400 m hurdles in 56.64, with the final two coming in a span of 35 minutes. Her fifth gold came in 4 x 400 m relay, and a final bronze in 4 x 100 m. She set a record in the process for most gold medals won at a single event in the history of the championships. In the first two of her wins, she equalled the Asian record held by Chi Cheng of Taiwan. She went on to better her personal best in 400 m a week later at the 1985 Canberra World Cup, when she clocked 51.61, finishing seventh. She almost replicated her Jakarta Championships performance at the 1986 Seoul Asian Games. She won the 100 metres silver with a time of 11.67 seconds losing the gold to Lydia de Vega. The 200 metres gold came in 23.44, 400 metres gold in 52.16 and 4 x 400 m relay gold in 3:34.58, all of which were new Games records. At the Games, British athletics coach Jim Alford said of her, "Usha is a first class athlete, a tough competitor and a terrific runner to watch. She has all the potential. Given careful guidance, she can be world class."

Later stage 

From 1983–89, Usha garnered 13 golds at ATF meets.  In the 10th Asian Games held at Seoul in 1986, Usha won 4 gold medals and 1 silver medal in the track and field events.  She also won five gold medals at the 6th Asian Track and Field Championship in Jakarta in 1985. Her medals at the same meet is a record for a single athlete in a single international meet.

Currently she is committee head of Indian Talent organization which conducts the National Level Indian Talent Olympiad examinations in schools across India.

Achievements

 She represented India in 4 x 100 metres relay together with  Valdivel Jayalakshmi, Rachita Mistry, and E.B. Shyla at the 1998 Asian Championships in Athletics where her team won the gold medal on way to setting the current national record of 44.43 s.

Personal life
She studied in Providence Women's College in Kozhikode.

Usha married V. Srinivasan, an inspector with Central Industrial Security Force, in 1991. The couple has a son. Name Dr. Vignesh Ujjwal.

Advisor 
Currently, she is a member of the Board of Advisors of India's International Movement to Unite Nations (I.I.M.U.N.).

Awards and honours
 Honorary doctorate (D.Litt.) conferred by Kannur University in 2000
 Honorary doctorate (D.Sc.) conferred by IIT Kanpur in 2017
 Honorary doctorate (D.Litt.) conferred by University of Calicut in 2018
 IAAF Veteran Pin in 2019
Padma Shri in 1985

Statistics

International competitions

See also
 List of Indian records in athletics
 List of Indian sportswomen
 List of Kerala Olympians

Further reading

Notes

References

External links 
 
 
 

1964 births
Living people
Sportswomen from Kerala
People from Kozhikode district
Indian female sprinters
Indian female hurdlers
20th-century Indian women
20th-century Indian people
Olympic athletes of India
Athletes (track and field) at the 1980 Summer Olympics
Athletes (track and field) at the 1984 Summer Olympics
Athletes (track and field) at the 1988 Summer Olympics
Asian Games gold medalists for India
Asian Games silver medalists for India
Asian Games medalists in athletics (track and field)
Athletes (track and field) at the 1982 Asian Games
Athletes (track and field) at the 1986 Asian Games
Athletes (track and field) at the 1990 Asian Games
Athletes (track and field) at the 1994 Asian Games
Athletes (track and field) at the 1998 Asian Games
World Athletics Championships athletes for India
Malayali people
Recipients of the Padma Shri in sports
Recipients of the Arjuna Award
Medalists at the 1982 Asian Games
Medalists at the 1986 Asian Games
Medalists at the 1990 Asian Games
Medalists at the 1994 Asian Games
Athletes from Kerala
Nominated members of the Rajya Sabha
Indian sports executives and administrators
Sportspeople from Kozhikode